The ISO standard vehicle identification number (VIN) was introduced for the Porsche model year 1981.

Decoding 
VINs consist of 17 characters and for Porsche can be decoded as follows:-

Vehicle Specification for USA etc (positions 4, 5 and 6)

VIN has been implemented differently in two regions, they consist of the following countries:-

USA etc. = USA, Canada, Mexico, Japan and Switzerland.

RoW = Rest of world. (i.e. everywhere except USA, Canada, Mexico, Japan and Switzerland.)

Vehicle Specification for "USA etc" is a 3 character code giving details of the body type, engine, seatbelts and airbags fitted.

(More info needed.)

Examples of model type codes (positions 7, 8 and 12)
On 2010+ North America market vehicles, the first digit will be 'A' instead of '9'

 Cayenne = 9PA then 92A
 Panamera = 970
 Boxster = 986, 987, 981, A82, 982
 Cayman = 987, 981, A82, 982
 Carrera GT = 980
 911 = 901, 930, 964, 993, 996, 997, 991, 992
 924 = 924
 924 Turbo = 931
 924 Carrera GT/GTS/GTR = 937
 928 = 928
 944 = 944
 944 Turbo = 951
 959 = 959
 968 = 968
 Taycan = Y1A (sedan), Y1B (cross turismo and sport turismo)

Year codes (position 10) More properly described as 'Model year'. While the code may indicate a particular year it may well be the 'model year' which could be the subsequent year, for instance a 1994 registered vehicle may well be a model year 1995 on the VIN/chassis number.

Factory codes (position 11)

Model Configuration Code (position 13)
A leading "0" usually means standard coupé, for the RoW markets. For the 944 and 968, US cars are usually identified by a leading "5". 944 convertibles have a leading "3" (RoW) or "8" (US). Sometimes this model code extends into the 14th digit, such as for the 968 CS which had chassis numbers beginning with "15".

Examples 

WP0ZZZ94ZFN40**** a 944.

WP0ZZZ98Z7U770439**** a Cayman''''

WP0ZZZ92ZGN40**** a 924S.

WP1ZZZ9PZ8LA7**** a Cayenne.

WP0ZZZ96ZRS81**** a 968.

WP0ZZZ99Z5S73**** a 911.

WP0ZZZ97ZAL08**** a Panamera.

WP0ZZZ98Z4L00**** a Carrera GT.

WP0ZZZ98Z8U72**** a Boxster S.

WP0ZZZ99Z5S76**** a 911 C2S Convertible.

WP0ZZZ99Z2S64**** a 911 C4 convertible.

WP1AF2A51FLB9**** a Macan Turbo

WPOZZZ95ZJS90**** a 959

WP1ZZZ9YZLDA3**** a Cayenne E-hybrid

WP0ZZZ99ZKS12**** a Targa 4 GTS

WP0AA2Y18NSA1**** a 2022 Taycan sedan, RWD, for North America

References

Most of the information summarised here was first published in articles by Chris Horton in the December 2010 and January 2011 editions of Porsche Post (Magazine of the Porsche Club Great Britain), additional information was first posted on 968uk.com in November 2004.

External
Porsche VIN decoder

Porsche